The 2014 Samarkand Challenger was a professional tennis tournament played on clay courts. It was the 18th edition of the tournament which was part of the 2014 ATP Challenger Tour. It took place in Samarkand, Uzbekistan between 12 and 17 May 2014.

Singles main-draw entrants

Seeds

 1 Rankings are as of May 5, 2014.

Other entrants
The following players received wildcards into the singles main draw:
  Sarvar Ikramov
  Temur Ismailov
  Karen Khachanov
  Vaja Uzakov

The following players received entry from the qualifying draw:
  Anton Zaitcev
  Sanjar Fayziev
  Denys Molchanov
  Aleksandr Lobkov

Doubles main-draw entrants

Seeds

 1 Rankings are as of May 5, 2014.

Other entrants
The following pairs received wildcards into the doubles main draw:
  Sarvar Ikramov /  Djurabeck Karimov
  Shonigmatjon Shofayziyev /  Vaja Uzakov
  Sanjar Fayziev /  Temur Ismailov

Champions

Singles

 Farrukh Dustov def.  Aslan Karatsev, 7–6(7–4), 6–1

Doubles

 Sergey Betov /  Aliaksandr Bury def.  Shonigmatjon Shofayziyev /  Vaja Uzakov, 6–4, 6–3

External links
Official Website

Samarkand Challenger
Samarkand Challenger
Samarkand Challenger
Samarkand Challenger